Professor John Guest Phillips FRS FZS  (13 June 1933 – 14 March 1987) was an eminent biologist. He was born in Swansea and educated at Llanelli Boys' Grammar School and the University of Liverpool; where, after gaining his BSc, he joined the research group of Chester Jones to complete a PhD in endocrinology. Following his doctorate he took up a fellowship at the Bingham Oceanographic Laboratory at Yale University with Grace E. Pickford. After a lectureship at Sheffield University Phillips was appointed to the Chair of Zoology at the University of Hong Kong.  He returned to the UK to become Professor of Zoology, from 1967–79, and Dean of the Faculty of Science (1978-1980) at the University of Hull,  Director of the Wolfson Institute for Gerontology (1979-1986) (located at the University of Hull) and later Vice-Chancellor of Loughborough University from 1986-1987. He was secretary of the Zoological Society of London. Phillips' research was predominantly in the fields of endocrinology, notably concerning the salt glands of sea birds, and the biological basis of ageing (gerontology).

References

External links
Brief biography of John Phillips
 ‘PHILLIPS, Prof. John Guest’, Who Was Who, A & C Black, 1920–2008; online edn, Oxford University Press, Dec 2007, accessed 21 May 2011

1933 births
1987 deaths
Academics of the University of Hull
Alumni of the University of Liverpool
Fellows of the Royal Society
People educated at Llanelli Boys' Grammar School
Secretaries of the Zoological Society of London
Vice-Chancellors of Loughborough University
20th-century British zoologists
Scientists from Swansea